Jomo is an African masculine given name. Notable people with the name include:

 Jomo Kenyatta (circa 1894-1978), first Prime Minister and President of Kenya
 Jomo Kwame Sundaram (born 1952), Malaysian economist
 Jomo Sono (born 1955), South African soccer club owner
 Jomo Thomas (born 1974), American businessman
 Jomo Wilson (born 1983), American Arena Football League player

African masculine given names